Provoost is a surname. Notable people with the surname include:

 Jan Provoost (1465–1529), Flemish painter
 Samuel Provoost (1742–1815), third Presiding Bishop of the Episcopal Church, USA
 Anne Provoost (born 1964), Belgian author
 William Provoost (aka 'Guilliame Provoost') (fl. 1556–1607), Protestant in Antwerp who fled religious persecution and his descendants settled in New Amsterdam (now New York) in the early 1600s

Surnames of Belgian origin
Dutch-language surnames